Princess Hwisin (Hangul: 휘신공주, Hanja: 徽愼公主; 24 October 1491 - ?), or firstly honoured as Princess Hwisun (Hangul: 휘순공주, Hanja: 徽順公主), was a Joseon Royal Princess and the eldest daughter of Yeonsangun of Joseon and Deposed Queen Sin.

Her title as Princess was abolished after her father's abdication and was titled as Gu Mun-gyeong’s wife (구문경의 처), Lady Yi (이씨), Lady Gu (구씨) to follow her husband's clan, the Neungseong Gu clan.

Biography

Early life 
On 24 October 1491, the Princess was born when her father, Prince Yeonsan, and her mother, Princess Consort Geochang, were still the heir successor to the throne as Crown Prince and Crown Princess Consort. The Princess was eventually named Yi Su-Eok (Hangul: 이수억, Hanja: 李壽億). Through her mother, the Princess is a cousin of Queen Dangyeong and is a cousin-in-law of Princess Gyeongsun; the daughter of King Seongjong. She eventually became the great-grand aunt of Queen Inheon through her brother-in-law, Gu Hui-Gyeong (구희경, 具希璟), and his wife, Lady Sin of the Geochang Sin clan (거창 신씨, 居昌 愼氏); who was her and Queen Dangyeong’s younger cousin.

Princess Hwisin was the only child within her siblings to have survived to adulthood.

Marriage 
The Princess was arranged to marry with Gu Su-Yeong's son, Gu Mun-Gyeong, who was then given the title of Lord Neungyang (능양위) and had one son named Gu Eom in 1512. Gu Su-Yeong was the son-in-law of Grand Prince Yeongeung, the eight son of Sejong of Joseon and Queen Soheon of the Cheongsong Sim clan.

The Princess's maternal grandmother was Princess Jungmo, the first daughter of Grand Prince Imyeong with Grand Princess Consort Jean of the Jeonju Choi clan. The Princess's mother-in-law was Princess Gilan who was the daughter of Grand Prince Yeongeung; both Grand Prince Imyeong and Grand Prince Yeongeung were the sons of King Sejong and Queen Soheon and became her great-grandfathers. Princess Gilan was also a maternal cousin of Queen Jeongsun.

Yeonsangun’s Abdication 
However, after the Princess's father’s abdication, Princess Hwisin’s younger brothers died by poisoning, and her home was confiscated and divided among Park Won-Jong, Yoo Soon-jeong, and Sung Hui-an. But 2 years later in 1508, with the opinions of Yun Sun (유순, 柳洵) and other officials, the new King, Jungjong of Joseon, reunited the Princess and her husband. The king later visited her and her family as well as giving back her house.

Death 
When the Princess and her husband died, their direct descendants were cut off, and Yi Ahn-nul, the only adoptive grandson of their son Gu Eom, became a servant and served the ancestral rites for his grandparents and great-grandparents.

Family
Father - Yeonsangun of Joseon (23 November 1476 - 20 November 1506) (조선 연산군)
Grandfather - King Seongjong of Joseon (20 August 1457 - 20 January 1494) (조선 성종왕)
Grandmother - Queen Jeheon of the Haman Yun clan (15 July 1455 - 29 August 1482) (제헌왕후 윤씨)
Mother - Deposed Queen Sin (15 December 1476 - 16 May 1537) (폐비 신씨)
Grandfather - Sin Seung-Seon, Duke Jangseong, Internal Prince Geochang (1436 - 1502) (신승선 장성공 거창부원군)
Grandmother - Princess Jungmo, Internal Princess Consort Heungan of the Jeonju Yi clan (1435 - ?) (중모현주, 흥안부부인 전주 이씨)
Siblings
 Unnamed younger sister 
 Unnamed younger brother (1494 – 1494)
 Unnamed younger sister (1495 - 1495)
 Younger brother - Deposed Crown Prince Yi Hwang (10 January 1498 – 24 September 1506) (폐왕세자 이황)
 Younger brother - Yi Seong, Grand Prince Changnyeong (18 June 1500 – 10 October 1506) (이성 창녕대군)
 Younger brother - Grand Prince Yi In-su (대군 이인수, 李仁壽) (1501 - 12 September 1503)
 Younger brother - Grand Prince Yi Chong-su (대군 이총수, 李聰壽) (1502 - 1503)
 Younger brother - Grand Prince Yi Yeong-su (대군 이영수, 李榮壽) (1503 - 1503)

Husband
Gu Mun-Gyeong, Lord Neungyang (구문경 능양위, 具文璟  綾陽尉)
Father-in-law -  Gu Su-Yeong (구수영, 具壽永) (1456 - 1523)
Mother-in-law - Yi Eok-cheon, Princess Gilan of the Jeonju Yi clan (이억천 길안현주 이씨, 李億千 吉安縣主 李氏) (July 1457 - October 1519)

Issue
Son - Gu Eom (1512 - ?) (구엄)
 Daughter-in-law - Lady Sim of the Pungsan Sim clan (풍산 심씨, 豊山 沈氏)
 Daughter-in-law - Lady Hwang of the Jangsu Hwang clan (장수 황씨, 長水 黃氏) 
 Granddaughter - Gu Geum-ok (구금옥, 具金玉), Lady Gu of the Neungseong Gu clan (능성 구씨, 綾城 具氏) (1536 - ?)
 Grandson-in-law - Yi Pil (이필, 李泌) of the Deoksu Yi clan (덕수 이씨, 德水 李氏); grandson of Yi Gi
 Adoptive great-grandson - Yi Ahn-nul (이안눌, 李安訥) of the Deoksu Yi clan (덕수 이씨, 德水 李氏) (1571 - 1637)
 Daughter-in-law - Seong-shin (성신, 誠信); became a concubine slave
 Half-Granddaughter - Gu Geum-jin (구금진, 具金眞), Lady Gu of the Neungseong Gu clan (능성 구씨, 綾城 具氏) (1537 - ?)
 Half Grandson-in-law - Kim Geon-geun (김건곤, 金乾坤)
 Daughter-in-law - Bok-seong (복성, 福成); became a concubine slave
 Half-Granddaughter - Gu Ga-si (구가시, 具加屎), Lady Gu of the Neungseong Gu clan (능성 구씨, 綾城 具氏) (1538 - ?)
 Half Grandson-in-law - Kwon Eok-jung (권억종, 權億鍾)
 Daughter-in-law - Su-geum (수금, 壽今); a concubine slave
 Half-Grandson - Gu Sa-sin (구사신, 具思愼) (1539 - ?)
 Half Granddaughter-in-law - Lady Bae of the Seongju Bae clan (성주 배씨, 星州 裵氏)
 Half Granddaughter-in-law - Lady Go (고씨, 高氏)
 Daughter-in-law - Ae-yeong (애영, 愛英); became a concubine slave
 Half-Granddaughter - Gu Mu-saeng (구무생, 具戊生), Lady Gu of the Neungseong Gu clan (능성 구씨, 綾城 具氏) (1548 - ?)
 Half Grandson-in-law - Kwon Ong (권옹, 權顒)

References

1491 births
Year of death unknown
Date of death unknown
Princesses of Joseon
House of Yi